Marhota is a village in the Kotli District of Azad Kashmir, Pakistan. Neighbouring settlements include Bindian and Banabona.

References

Populated places in Kotli District